Taurolema hirsuticornis is a species of beetle in the family Cerambycidae. It was described by Chevrolat in 1861. It is known from Argentina and Brazil.

References

Mauesiini
Beetles described in 1861